The 2013–14 Danish Superliga season was the 24th season of the Danish Superliga, which decided the Danish football championship.

Teams 
AC Horsens and Silkeborg IF finished the 2012–13 season in 11th and 12th place, respectively, and were relegated to the 2013–14 1st Division.

The relegated teams were replaced by 2012–13 1st Division champions Viborg FF and the runners-up FC Vestsjælland.

Stadia and locations

Personnel and sponsoring
Note: Flags indicate national team as has been defined under FIFA eligibility rules. Players and Managers may hold more than one non-FIFA nationality.

Managerial changes

League table

Positions by round

Results

Matchday 1–11

Matchday 12–33

Top scorers

References 

Danish Superliga seasons
1
Denmark